The House That Dirt Built is the second studio album by English rock band The Heavy. It was released on 5 October 2009. The title is a reference to the nursery rhyme This Is the House That Jack Built. Vocalist Kelvin Swaby explained in an interview with Songfacts that the song "Sixteen" was inspired by a time when he was working a lot as a DJ and he would see 16-year-old kids sneaking into clubs.

The album's songs were used for several video games and films; "Short Change Hero" was featured in the promo for the first season of Haven, the 2010 movie Faster, the trailer for the 2011 video game Batman: Arkham City, later opened the 2012 video game Borderlands 2, and the promo for Season 2 of Longmire. It is also the opening theme of the Sky1 television series Strike Back and was included in the 2011 racing video game Driver: San Francisco (along with two other songs from the band) as well as the Season 2 finale of Suits. The song "How You Like Me Now?" was featured at the beginning and end of the 2010 film The Fighter, in the Season 3 finale of Suits, in the trailer for the 2012 film Ted, during the closing credits for Horrible Bosses, the closing credits for Borderlands 2, and then again in a TV spot for the 2013 animated film, Turbo.

Track listing

References

2009 albums
The Heavy (band) albums
Albums produced by Jim Abbiss
Ninja Tune albums